Daniel Friderici (1584 – 23 September 1638) was a German cantor, conductor, and composer.

Life
Friderici was born in Eichstaedt (today Querfurt) to a poor family and had been a choirboy in his younger years. He was trained by Valentin Haussmann and Frederick Weissensee. In 1612 he enrolled at the University of Rostock. Two years later he was appointed as a cantor for Oldenburg by Count Anton Günther and later moved in 1618 to the same position at the St. Mary's Church in Rostock. After he had finished his training, he was appointed conductor of all churches in Rostock. There he worked until he died there in 1638 from the plague.

Works
He wrote many high quality secular and sacred polyphonic vocal works, which became widely known in his lifetime and afterwards. He wrote Musica figuralis which taught techniques of singing.

Sacred works
Sertum Musicale primum oder Erstes Musicalisches Kräntzlein. 1614
Sertum musicale alterum oder Anderes Musicalisches Kräntzlein.  1619
Psalmus Regii Prophetae Davidis. 1622
Bicinia sacra. 1623
Viridarium Musicum Sacrum. 1625
Selige Grab- und Himmels Leiter von sieben Spalten. 1628
Deliciae iuveniles. 1630

Secular works
Servia musicalis prima. 1614
Servia musicalis altera. 1617
Newes gantz lustiges und kurtzweiliges Quodlibet. 1622
Newe Avisen 1635
Amores musicales oder newe gantz lustige und anmutige weltl. Liedlein. 1624
Honores musicales oder newe gantz lustige Ehrenliedlein. 1624
Amuletum musicum contra melancholiam. 1627
Hilarodicon das ist: Gantz artige und sehr lustige newe Vinetten oder Wein Liederlein. 1632
Amores musicales oder newe gantz lustige Amorosische Liedlein. 1633.

Writings
Musica figuralis oder newe Unterweisung der Singe Kunst. Rostock 1618.

Bibliography

Modern editions
Florian Grampp (Hrsg.): Deutsche Gesangstraktate des 17. Jahrhunderts. Bärenreiter, Kassel 2006, . (Faksimile von Fridericis Musica figuralis zusammen mit Johann Andreas Herbst: Musica Moderna Prattica und Johann Crüger: Musicae practicae praecepta brevia.)

Further reading
 Martin Ruhnke Friderici, Daniel. In: Friedrich Blume (ed.): Die Musik in Geschichte und Gegenwart. 1. Ausgabe. Band 4. Bärenreiter, Kassel 1955, Sp. 937–942.
Andreas Waczkat: Friderici, Friedrich, Fridrich, Daniel. In: Ludwig Finscher (ed.): Die Musik in Geschichte und Gegenwart. 2. Ausgabe. Personenteil. Band 7: Fra - Gre. Bärenreiter, Kassel/Metzler, Stuttgart 2002, Sp. 120–122.

External links

1584 births
1638 deaths
People from Querfurt
German Baroque composers
German classical composers
Music in Mecklenburg-Western Pomerania
University of Rostock alumni
17th-century classical composers
German male classical composers
17th-century male musicians